Gerard M. Karam is an American lawyer who serves as the United States attorney for the Middle District of Pennsylvania.

Education 

Karam earned a Bachelor of Arts degree from Saint Joseph's University in 1984 and a Juris Doctor from the Loyola University New Orleans College of Law in 1987.

Career 

From 1987 to 1995, Karam worked as an independent attorney. Karam joined the Lackawanna County Public Defender's Office in 1991 and remained there until 2003, eventually serving as chief public defender. From 1997 to 2001, he served as a member of the Criminal Justice Act Panel for the United States District Court for the Middle District of Pennsylvania. Since 1995, he has also worked as an attorney at Mazzoni Karam Petorak and Valvano.

U.S. attorney for the Middle District of Pennsylvania 

On April 22, 2022, President Joe Biden announced his intent to nominate Karam to serve as the U.S. attorney for the Middle District of Pennsylvania. On April 25, 2022, his nomination was sent to the Senate. On June 9, 2022, his nomination was reported out of the Senate Judiciary Committee by a voice vote; senators Ted Cruz, Mike Lee, Josh Hawley and Marsha Blackburn were recorded as "Nay". He was confirmed in the Senate by voice vote on June 13, 2022. He was sworn into office on June 21, 2022.

References

External links 

Living people
20th-century American lawyers
21st-century American lawyers
Loyola University New Orleans College of Law alumni
Pennsylvania lawyers
People from Lackawanna County, Pennsylvania
Public defenders
Saint Joseph University alumni
Year of birth missing (living people)
United States Attorneys for the Middle District of Pennsylvania